Black Lace are a British pop band, best known for novelty party records, including their biggest hit, "Agadoo". The band first came to the public eye after being selected to represent the UK in the 1979 Eurovision Song Contest, in which they finished seventh with the song "Mary Ann". With numerous line-up changes (the only original member being Colin Gibb), Black Lace went on to have success with novelty party anthems such as "Superman" and "Do the Conga".

Today, Black Lace consists of two working bands: the full-time international band (officially known as The Original Black Lace) featuring original member Colin Gibb, who has taken the band around the world playing party shows throughout Europe, the Middle East, Australia, Canada and the US; and the UK based part-time band, featuring ex member Dene Michael.

Pre-Black Lace (1973–1975) 
Terry Dobson and school friend Ian Howarth formed The Impact, as a five-piece pop group in 1969, with Alan Barton, Steve Scholey and Nigel Scott. The group also performed under the names Penny Arcade and Love or Confusion.

Ian Howarth left the band for a short while but returned to the line-up in 1974, and Dobson also left to be replaced briefly by Neil Hardcastle. Dobson then re-joined and Scott left in 1975; that same year the band adopted the name Black Lace. Ian Howarth left the band for good in 1976, and was replaced by Colin Gibb (born Colin Routh, 8 December 1953).

Black Lace (1976–1981) 
After turning professional at the beginning of 1976, the band toured the majority of the UK, managed by Keith Mills, commencing their first summer season at the Skegness Bier Garten. The following year their summer season would take them to Butlins in Filey, North Yorkshire and Skegness, Lincolnshire. An EP was recorded and produced by comedian Freddie 'Parrotface' Davis at his studio, which was to be sold at their shows. The group were voted Yorkshire Band of the Year by BBC Radio Leeds, and best clubland group playing at the Winter Gardens, Blackpool.

In 1979, Black Lace recorded their first single, "Mary Ann", for ATV music and a recording contract followed with EMI. As the song required a more 'throaty' vocal, Alan Barton was switched to being lead singer, with Steve Scholey moving to backing vocals for the band's recordings, but remained as lead singer on live performances.  The song won the BBC Television's A Song For Europe and the band went on to represent the UK At the 1979 Eurovision Song Contest held in Israel, the band finished seventh. Other television appearances around this time included Nationwide, Multi-Coloured Swap Shop, Top of the Pops and Juke Box Jury. "Mary Ann" reached No. 42 in the UK Singles Chart.

The band's follow-up single, "So Long Suzy Baby", failed to chart in the UK (as EMI couldn't decide on which track should be used and delayed on the planned release date), but achieved success in Europe. Black Lace found great success with live performances and TV shows, notably the 'Sopot International music festival' in Poland and the 'Golden Orpheus festival' in Bulgaria, and on TV in East Germany, West Germany and Spain.

The band toured Denmark in 1980, supporting Suzi Quatro and working with Tommy Seebach, a Danish entertainer. Black Lace and Seebach recorded "Hey Hey Jock McRay" for the Danish singles market, but an intended 1980 tour of Poland was called off because of political unrest in the country.

Chart success (1981–1987)
In 1981, the band split. Dobson joined the Castleford rock band Stormer who had a recording contract with Ringo Starr. Scholey departed, leaving the others to settle huge debts incurred whilst touring. The band became a duo of Gibb and Barton. It was this line-up that would give the band its biggest chart success.

The duo played the Northern club circuit using pre-recorded backing tracks, which was controversial at the time. Initially they used the name 'Lace' but soon reverted to 'Black Lace' and recruited a new manager, John Wagstaff. They recorded an instrumental single based on the "Chicken Dance", released as "Birds Dance" in 1981 (using the name 'Buzby' instead of Black Lace). However, the record was beaten to the charts by another version of the song by The Tweets released as "The Birdie Song". "Birds Dance" has since been retitled "The Birdie Song" and included on Black Lace albums.

Black Lace's 1983 "Superman" single was their first one under their own name on the Flair label, and a promotional video was shot at Casanova's nightclub in Wakefield. One of the hired dancers was the then unknown singer Jane McDonald. "Superman" reached No. 9 in the UK chart, but an attempt at a follow-up single "Hey You!" failed to chart despite being BBC Radio One's 'Record of the Week'. Black Lace received a silver disc for sales of "Superman". They proceeded to tour Denmark with Danish stars 'Laban' and 'Snapshots'

The band's biggest success came in 1984 with the single "Agadoo", selling over one million copies worldwide and reaching No. 2 in the UK chart. "Agadoo" was a hit in Europe, South Africa and Australia. Having been presented with a gold disc for sales in the UK. In a radio interview, presenter, Richard Whiteley forgets Gibb's name and refers to him as 'Mr Agadoo' (the name, Dean Michaels later adopts for himself, although having no connection with the actual record) The duo recorded their first album Black Lace at Stuck Ranch studios in Denmark. Around this time their record distribution company 'Pinicle' went into receivership, leading to Black Lace and their record company losing an estimated quarter of a million pounds in unpaid royalties for "Agadoo".

The band's follow-up single, "Do The Conga", reached No. 10 in the UK chart, and the accompanying album Party Party – 16 Great Party Icebreakers sold over 650,000 copies in the first five weeks, reaching double platinum status and leading to the band doing TV shows in Germany, Luxembourg, France and Denmark.

In 1985 another single, "El Vino Collapso", was released, with the video shot in Skegness. It failed to reach the top 40, stalling at No. 42 in the UK Singles Chart due to it being 'banned' by the BBC in the wake of the Heysel Stadium disaster, as it had references to "drinking whilst abroad" and deemed unsuitable for radio play. Further releases "I Speaka Da Lingo" and "Hokey Cokey" reached No. 49 and No. 31, respectively.

Black Lace also participated in the recording of the UK No. 1 hit "You'll Never Walk Alone" as part of the charity ensemble, The Crowd (which included members of 10cc, Thin Lizzy, Motörhead, The Hollies, Argent, The Who, The Nolans, The Searchers, Smokie, Gerry and the Pacemakers, plus many more) to raise funds for the families of the victims of the Bradford City stadium fire.

Black Lace's second album Party Party 2 was released for Christmas 1985, and television appearances included a Black Lace special on the BBC 2 rock show The Old Grey Whistle Test, plus  3-2-1, ITV Telethon, Miss Yorkshire Television, International Disco Dance Championship, Pebble Mill at One, and Top of the Pops Christmas Special. Because of such a demanding work schedule, Barton and Gibb found it necessary to charter a private aircraft to meet the deadlines, but the band's success led to a tax demand in excess of £100,000.

In 1986, Dene Michael replaced Gibb, who took time out of live work with Black Lace (remaining an official member of the band) to concentrate on other projects including: promoting pop act 'Party Party' and participating in two tours of Germany, concentrating on a part-time photography business, setting up a food retail outlet, and a music equipment retail and installation business. 

Another single, "Wig Wam Bam", (featuring Barton, Gibb and Michael) reached No. 63 in the UK chart, but "Viva La Mexico", which was released to capitalise on the 1986 FIFA World Cup football competition, flopped when England was knocked out. Black Lace (Barton and Michael) appeared as themselves in the filming of the 1987 film Rita, Sue and Bob Too, which featured "Gang Bang" and "Have a Screw", which had been recorded by Barton and Gibb the previous year. The pair were also immortalised as caricatures in the TV show 'Spitting Image' and the hit single 'The Chicken Song'. The band had a UK hit with their album Party Crazy.

Later career (1987–present)
September 1987 saw a switch round, Gibb returned ‘full-time’ with the band whilst Barton left to join Smokie. Michael became a full-time member of Black Lace and he and Gibb released the single "Jammin' the Sixties" under the name Barracuda. The record was BBC Radio One's Record of the Week, but failed to chart. 

A summer seasons at the Blackpool Tower followed in 1989 and 1990, plus performances at the 'BBC Radio One Roadshow' in the town, along with the release of the single "I Am The Music Man" which peaked at No. 52 in the UK.
In 1991, due to personal issues, Michael was forced to leave the band to be replaced by Rob Hopcraft. The pair released the single "Penny Arcade", penned by close friend Sammy King, which had originally been a hit for Roy Orbison in 1979. The band appeared on the BBC's Children in Need programme. Under an agreement with Gibb and Wagstaf, not to use the 'Black lace' name, Michael forms new band and uses the name ‘'Barracuda'’ (a pseudonym previously used by Black Lace for the single 'Jamin the 60's)but shortly disband.

1992 Black Lace toured Australia, but Hopcraft was unhappy with a hits album released by an Australian record company as it featured a photograph of his predecessor Dene Michael.

1994 saw the release of the single "Bullshit (Cotton Eyed Joe)", but the race for the charts was won by the Swedish band Rednex with another version of the same song. An album, Saturday Night, followed.

In 1995, Barton died as a result of a coach crash in Germany while touring with Smokie. Also in that year Black Lace shot a promotional video for the single "Electric Slide" in Benidorm, the first video not to be filmed in the UK, and played on British breakfast station GMTV live from Torremolinos in Spain.

Black Lace played one-off shows in 1996 at DJ conventions in Canada and Atlantic City, New Jersey, United States. They released the Action Party and Best Of albums. Gibb was presented with a special Agadoo guitar to celebrate the band's 20th anniversary, but in 1996 Gibb was also made bankrupt by the Inland Revenue.

15 August 1997 was dubbed Agadoo Day. Black Lace played 20 shows in 24 hours in Manchester, London, Watford, Northampton, Sheffield, Barnsley, Wakefield, and Leeds, finishing at the Frontier Club, Batley. The event raised over £25,000 for Marie Curie Cancer Care. Peugeot used "Agadoo" in a TV advertisement for the new 106 car, and Black Lace re-recorded the track renaming it 'Agadoo 106 mix', donating all their royalties to 'Marie Curie Cancer Care'. The record spent one week in the UK chart. 

A 1999 Black Lace charity reunion concert was organised by their former drummer, Terry Dobson, to celebrate 20 years since the band represented the UK in the Eurovision Song Contest. Live television interviews took place with ITV's Calendar, and the BBC's regional news programmes, on the day of the event. The late Alan Barton's son, Dean, took Alan's place in the band, but original member Steve Scholey declined to attend.

In 2000, Black Lace become the first band to play at the ill-fated Millennium Dome.

2001 brought a totally different line up style as Hopcraft was replaced by female vocalist/dancer Camille Wagstaff, and the single "Follow the Leader" was released before disbanding. 

In 2002, Colin Gibb took the original Black Lace show to Tenerife, playing the now internationally famous 'party shows' in hotels and restaurants on the island, occasionally visiting the UK for TV appearances. In 2003, an adult-themed album called Blue (originally recorded in the UK years previously by Gibb and Michael, and 'banned' by their own record label) was released. In 2004, Gibb took the Black Lace show to mainland Spain to appear alongside Elvis tribute artiste Mike Young and other guest acts at 'The King Lives On' cabaret bar on the Costa Blanca, returning to Tenerife for contracted shows in 2005. In 2007, Gibb married in the UK his long-time girlfriend Sue Kelly. In 2008, Gibb was invited to play bass with the Tenerife-based five-piece rock band 'The Phoenix', along with the duos 'To The Limit' and 'Just one more'. More recently, he played in the blues rock band Traveler, in addition to performing the Black Lace Show.

In 2007, Michael started performing again as Black Lace (in contradiction to an agreement with Gibb and record company/management NOW Music, stating he would never use the title 'Black Lace') alongside a new addition, the Liverpudlian singer Ian Robinson. They released a new mambo version of "Agadoo". In the accompanying video, Bruce Jones played a cameo role and directed the event. Roy "Chubby" Brown and Kevin Kennedy also made cameo appearances in the video, as did several members of the cast of the ITV situation comedy Benidorm. On 4 November 2009, the 'new' incarnation of Black Lace was filmed by the British airline easyJet, performing a re-written version of "Agadoo" for release on the video-sharing website YouTube, launching a new air service between Gatwick Airport and Agadir in Morocco. Dobson's book, And Then Came Agadoo, was published by Authorhouse in November 2009.

Michael and Robinson recorded a new version of "I Am The Music Man" for the BBC Children in Need appeal in 2009. In 2010, they recorded yet another version of "I Am The Music Man", this time entitled "We Are The England Fans", as an unofficial England supporters' song to coincide with the 2010 FIFA World Cup, which also included the future Black Lace member Craig Harper. In 2011, Michael and Robinson recorded a television advertisement for Thetrainline.com which led to a new recording of "Do The Conga". In December that year, Michael teamed up with Crissy Rock and recorded a Christmas single called "Christmas Time" and an accompanying video. In 2012, Michael recorded two solo records, Life Force and The First Christmas Light.

In 2014, to celebrate the 30th anniversary of "Agadoo", a limited edition Black Lace Live album was released, which was recorded and mixed in Tenerife.

In 2015, 'Original' Black Lace member; Colin Gibb, releases 'Agadoo (Space Mix)' which is an updated remix of the 'Agadoo 106 mix'

A television advertisement for Walkers crisps was shown on British TV, featuring Michael and Robinson (under the name 'Old Lace') performing alongside Gary Lineker singing along to "Agadoo".

In 2015, Gibb, celebrating 40 years since Black Lace was formed, teamed up with guitarist and vocalist Gordon King for live shows, keeping the style and tradition of the original format: loud guitars, even louder shirts, cheesy dance routines and that 'tongue in cheek' and sometimes 'risky' comedy.

In 2016, Dene Michael was charged with fraud and jailed for six months for claiming £25,000 in disability allowances.

In 2018, Dene Michael teamed up with Craig Harper (runner up of series two of Britain's Got Talent back in 2008) to form an 'alternative' Black Lace a.k.a. 'Black Lace's Conga Party' They played many of the UK's 80s 'revival' festivals and can be seen performing at holiday centres around the country.

Black Lace (Gibb and King) are nominated at the Tenerife Entertainment Awards for Best Group.

In 2019, Black Lace (Gibb and King) became associated with UK dressage team The Agadoo Girls, consisting of 7 members with Gibb's cousin Debbie Cox, as team captain. They came top at their debut Team Quest competition at Richmond Equestrian Centre in June.

The Original Black Lace (Gibb/King) concluded 2019 having performed 278 shows in 221 days.

On 8 May, 2020, Rob Hopcraft died, thought to be the result of a fall.

In June 2020, in remembrance of Alan Barton, who died 25 years ago, the Black Lace ‘Reunion’ band consisting of; Ian Howarth, Terry Dobson, Colin Gibb and Dean Barton (Alan's son), re made a music video of the band's 1979 Eurovision hit ‘Mary Ann’ under strict lockdown conditions, due to the COVID-19 pandemic. The recording was done individually from their respective homes in The UK, Tenerife and Gozo then mixed together by Hawarth in UK.

2022. Due to severe back isues,  Gordon King steps down from the band.

In popular culture
The group were famously lampooned in the UK No. 1 chart single "The Chicken Song", recorded as part of the Spitting Image programme. A parody of Black Lace's style, it contained a specific reference to the band members Barton/ Gibb with the line "those two wet gits with their girly curly hair".

Black Lace (Barton and Gibb) have also been voted in the top five all time 'Best Party' songs, 'Best Holiday' songs, and 'Worst Records of all time'

Personnel
Current members
 Colin Gibb (Original Black Lace) 
 Gordon King (Original Black Lace) 
 Dene Michael (Black Lace Conga Party) 
 Craig Harper (Black Lace Conga Party) 

Former members
Alan Barton (d. 1995) – guitar, lead and backing vocals (1973–1987)
Terry Dobson – drums, backing vocals (1973–1981)
Ian Howarth – lead guitar, bass guitar (1973–1974)
Steve Scholey – lead vocals (1973–1981)
Rob Hopcraft (d. 2020) – lead vocals (1991–2000)

Discography

Albums
 1984: Black Lace
 1984: Party Party – 16 Great Party Icebreakers (UK #4)
 1985: Party Party 2 (UK #18)
 1986: Party Crazy (UK #58)
 1987: 16 Greatest Party Hits
 1990: 20 All Time Party Favourites
 1993: Action Party
 1995: Saturday Night
 1997: Greatest Hits
 1998: What a Party
 2000: Black Lace's Greatest Ever Party Album
 2006: Black Lace: Greatest Hits
 2010: The Blue Album – Banned in the UK [world-wide distribution]
 2013: The Blue Album – Banned in the UK – 're-release' [world-wide distribution]
 2014: Black Lace 'Live Beach Party' (limited edition)

Singles

References

External links
 Official Black Lace website
 Colin Gibb – Black Lace
 N.O.W. Music Co (Black Lace) webpage
 And Then Came Agadoo – book website
 Denemichael.co.uk
 Ianhowarth.co.uk

Eurovision Song Contest entrants of 1979
English pop music groups
British novelty song performers
Eurovision Song Contest entrants for the United Kingdom
Music in Yorkshire
Sonet Records artists
Telstar Records artists